Hoghton Tower is a fortified manor house  east of the village of Hoghton, Lancashire, England, and standing on a hilltop site on the highest point in the area. It takes its name from the de Hoghton family, its historical owners since at least the 12th century. The present house dates from about 1560–65.

It was damaged during the Civil War and subsequently became derelict, but was rebuilt and extended between 1862 and 1901. The house is listed at Grade I, as is the Great Barn in its grounds, which is dated 1692. Also in the grounds are two structures listed at Grade II. The house and garden are open to the public at advertised times, and are administered by a charitable trust, the Hoghton Tower Preservation Trust.

History
The property is on a hill at the southwesterly tip of the Pendle range. The land on which the house stands has been in the possession of the de Hoghton family from at least the 12th century. The present building dates from about 1560–65, and was built for the Right Worshipful Thomas de Hoghton (1518–1580), replacing an earlier house on or near the same site. It has been suggested that the property has links to William Shakespeare through Alexander Hoghton who died in 1581.

King James I stayed in the house from 15 to 18 August 1617, while returning from his visit to Scotland, an occasion later made the subject of an oil painting by the Victorian artist George Cattermole. There he is portrayed approaching the main gateway in procession, accompanied by his favourite George Villiers, 1st Duke of Buckingham and by the Earls of Pembroke, Richmond, Nottingham, and Bridgewater; Lords Zouche, Knollys, Mordaunt, Grey, Stanhope and Compton; the Bishop of Chester Thomas Morton, many baronets and knights, and various Lancashire notables. 

On 13 August he had hunted at Myerscough Lodge near Garstang where, according to the diary of Nicolas Assheton of Downham, the king spoke about "liberty to pipeing and honest recreation", in response to a petition from local people. He was at Preston on 15 August and rode to Hoghton where he was met by two actors representing the household gods, one the domestic spirit and the other the guardian of the chase. The next day, a Sunday, there was an attempt to disrupt the church service at Hoghton with distracting noises, for the same cause. James listened to representations from Lancashire gentry and asked Bishop Morton to draft a response, a forerunner of the Book of Sports. On Sunday afternoon James visited the nearby alum mines at Pleasington. He wrote to his friend in Scotland, the Earl of Mar, asking him to send two terriers or earth hounds for fox hunting.

On Monday evening there was a masque danced by the lords and gentlemen on the circle of the lawn at Hoghton. The menu for the feast on the 17 and 18 August, with the names of the cooks and kitchen workers, survives. On 18 August the king left for Lathom House. Following a petition of the people of Lancashire he lifted the restrictions on Sunday recreations, that culminated in the publishing, initially just for Lancashire, and then nationally the following year, of the Book of Sports.

A commonly repeated anecdote claims that, whilst being entertained during his visit, James was so impressed by the quality of his steak that he knighted the loin of beef, which was referred to thereafter as "Sir loin". There is no reliable evidence for this explanation and scholars generally hold it to be a myth.

In 1643 the house was damaged by Parliamentary forces during the Civil War. In February 1643, after the taking of Preston by  Sir John Seaton, Hoghton Tower was besieged by Parliamentary troops under Captain Nicholas Starkie of Huntroyd. At the time the house held a garrison of only 30-40 musketeers, who capitulated on 14 February. But when the Roundheads entered the house, the powder magazine in the old pele tower, between the two courtyards, exploded with immense force, killing over 100 Parliamentary men. This central tower was never rebuilt.

From 1662, for over a hundred years, Hoghton Tower housed nonconformist services in the Banqueting Hall, after Sir Gilbert's son Sir Richard (1616-1678) converted to Presbyterianism and by 1664 it had become a centre, in the Blackburn District, for both Independents and Presbyterians. John and Charles Wesley are reputed to have preached at Hoghton.

In 1692–1702 Sir Charles de Hoghton, who founded Preston Grammar School, carried out repairs and rebuilding. King William III was a frequent visitor to the house, being a personal friend of Sir Charles. He was succeeded by the fifth baronet, Sir Henry, who in 1735 commissioned a topographical view of the house, "Hoghton Tower from Duxon Hill", from Arthur Devis. To the left of a panorama over the home fields, a minute coach is seen approaching the gateway up the broad avenue.

In 1768 the family permanently moved to another property and it was rented to local farmers; by the middle of the 19th century the house was derelict. Sir Henry de Hoghton, the 9th Baronet, inherited the estate in 1862 and decided to restore the house. When Charles Dickens visited in 1867, he found it still in a depressing state of disrepair. The mood of the place inspired his 1868 short story George Silverman's Explanation, in which the house features prominently.

It is not known who carried out the earlier part of the restoration, but by 1876 the Lancaster architects Paley and Austin were involved, having carried out work on rooms including the banqueting hall. Sir Henry died in 1876, and restoration work was continued by his brother, Charles, the 10th Baronet, although the house was not ready for him to take up residence until 1880. By that time Paley and Austin had restored the gateway tower and the adjacent walls (1877), designed an entrance lodge (1878), carried out work on the offices in the east wing, built a new kitchen, a new underground service corridor, and made other alterations (1879–80). A view of the restored gateway by local artist James 'Clock' Shaw (1836–1915) was painted at this time and is presently in Bury Art Museum. Further work on the stables and farm buildings was carried out by the Blackburn-based architect James Bertwistle. Sir Charles died in 1893, and from 1896 to 1901 the London architect Robert Dudley Oliver added nursery accommodation, a smoking room, a billiards room and a large drawing room (later used as the ballroom).

Architecture

Hoghton Tower is constructed in sandstone, with stone slate roofs. It has a double courtyard plan, the outer courtyard being entered on the west side through a large gatehouse. The gatehouse is embattled and in two storeys, with a central tower rising by more than one additional storey. Above its archway is a 16th-century cartouche containing a carving of Samson and the Lion. On each side of the gateway, embattled walls lead to square corner pavilions, which are also embattled. Buildings of differing dates stand on the north and south sides of the outer courtyard. This is in two levels, the eastern part being higher than the western. Between the two levels is a wall, and steps leading up to a gateway with 18th-century wrought iron gates between gate piers. In the northeast corner of the courtyard is a 17th-century well house, which stands on the traditional site of the original tower that was destroyed in the Civil War. The inner courtyard has a west gateway, a great hall and kitchen on the north side, state rooms on the east, and living rooms on the south and west sides; it is mainly in two storeys. At the north east corner is a porch (this was formerly the site of a chapel). Bay windows project from the north and south sides of the great hall.

Interior
The State Bedroom contains the State Bed carved at Samlesbury in about 1560–65. The beautifully proportioned Ballroom has fine, decorative late Victorian doors and panelling by Gillows of Lancaster. The Banqueting Hall has windows with 4,000 panes of Flemish stained glass, original decorative ceiling and a Minstrels' gallery. The house is known to contain three priest holes, including one cut into the side of the well.

Gardens and grounds

The house is approached by a long straight drive leading eastwards from the A675 road. Between these gates and the entrance to the outer courtyard is a grassed area known as the Tilting Ground, which is enclosed by a wall on the south side and the Great Barn to the north. On the east side of the house is a walled garden, known as the Wilderness, and on the south side are smaller walled gardens, the Rose Garden and the Rampart Garden. The Great Barn is constructed in sandstone with a slate roof, and incorporates a carthouse. It is dated 1692, and has ball finials on its gables. To the northwest of the house are the coach house and stables, also in sandstone, and dating from the 17th or early 18th century. A small cupola was added to it in the 19th century. At the entry to the drive on the main road is Paley and Austin's lodge of 1878.

Present day
Hoghton Tower and the Great Barn were designated as a Grade I listed buildings on 22 October 1952. Listed at Grade II are the coach house and stables, and the gate piers on the drive to the west of the house. The gardens are listed at Grade II on the National Register of Historic Parks and Gardens.

In 1978 the Hoghton Tower Preservation Trust was established as a charity for the preservation of the house, and to encourage education and research. It raises income by "charging an admission fee to visitors, running events, providing holiday accommodation and being rented out as a venue for weddings, filming, corporate entertainment and private functions". The house and gardens are open to the general public at advertised times. An admission fee is payable, which includes a guided tour of the house. Inside the house is a collection of dolls' houses. Interior photography is not permitted. Refreshments are available in the tea room, and the stables have been converted into a gift shop. Residential accommodation is available in a converted former garrison.

The house has been used as a film location on a number of occasions. For example, parts of the second series of Last Tango in Halifax (2012) were filmed here and the 2005 drama Cassanova starring David Tennant was partly filmed at the house.

Since 2015 the house and estate has been run by a team headed by Elena Faraoni, daughter of the current 14th Baronet, Bernard.

See also
Grade I listed buildings in Lancashire
Listed buildings in Hoghton
List of non-ecclesiastical works by Paley and Austin

Notes

References

Sources

Further reading

External links

Official website
Victoria County History (1911)

Country houses in Lancashire
Grade I listed buildings in Lancashire
Grade I listed houses
Historic house museums in Lancashire
Gardens in Lancashire
Paley and Austin buildings
Grade II listed parks and gardens in Lancashire
History of Lancashire
Buildings and structures in the Borough of Chorley
Hoghton